DMB may refer to:

 "D.M.B.", a song by ASAP Rocky
 DMB Development, a Limited Liability Corporation based in Scottsdale, Arizona
 DaMarcus Beasley, nicknamed DMB, an American soccer player 
 Dave Matthews Band, a U.S. rock band
 Del McCoury Band, a U.S. bluegrass band
 Delaware Memorial Bridge, a set of twin suspension bridges on the Delaware River
 Diamond Mind Baseball, a computer baseball simulation game
 Digital Multimedia Broadcasting, a digital radio transmission technology
 Dimethylbutane (disambiguation)
 Dimethylbutanol
 Dry Matter Basis, a technique of measuring animal feed contents